Yamazaki is a Japanese surname.

Yamazaki or Yamasaki may also refer to:

Yamazaki, an area in Japan along the border of Shimamoto, Osaka and Oyamazaki, Kyoto, which is the site of:
Battle of Yamazaki, a battle fought in 1582
Yamazaki distillery, Japan's first whisky distillery
Yamazaki Station (Kyoto), a railway station
Yamasaki, Hyōgo, a town in Japan
Yamasaki Corporation, a wrestling stable
Yamazaki Baking Company Limited, A Japanese company making bread

See also
Daily Yamazaki, convenience store
Yamazaki Mazak Corporation
Califano v. Yamasaki, a US Supreme Court case